Maradona by Kusturica is a documentary on the life of Argentine footballer Diego Maradona, directed by the award-winning Serbian filmmaker Emir Kusturica. The documentary premiered at the Cannes Film Festival 2008.

Cast 
 Emir Kusturica as himself
 Diego Maradona as himself
 Lucas Fuica as the member of the Maradonian Church

Soundtrack 
 Sex Pistols — "God Save the Queen"
 Manu Chao — "La vida tómbola"
 Rodrigo Bueno — "La mano de Dios"
 Ratones Paranoicos — "Para siempre Diego"
 Joaquín Sabina — "Mano a mano"

References

External links 
 
 Maradona Preview at Kustu.com

Serbian documentary films
Documentary films about association football
Films directed by Emir Kusturica
2000s Italian-language films
Serbian-language films
2000s Spanish-language films
Documentary films about sportspeople
Cultural depictions of Diego Maradona
Cultural depictions of Emir Kusturica
2000s English-language films